No Point in Wasting Tears is the debut album by Ironik and was released on 29 September 2008. The album entered the UK Albums Chart at number 21 but fell to number 36 in its second week. It was removed from the UK iTunes Store, but subsequently fully re-released on May 11, 2009, following the success of the album's third single, "Tiny Dancer (Hold Me Closer)," which reached number three on the UK Singles Chart.

Singles 
 The first official single from the album was "Stay With Me". The song charted at #5 on the UK Singles Chart.
 The second single was "I Wanna Be Your Man," which was released in digital form on 18 September, where it charted at #128 until the physical release one week later, when it peaked at no #35.
 The third single is a remix of Tiny Dancer (Hold Me Closer), which now features Chipmunk as well as Sir Elton John. The song was released on 27 April 2009. The song entered the UK Singles Chart on 3 May at #3. It is Ironik's highest charting single to date.

Track list

Charts

References 

2008 debut albums
Ironik albums
Asylum Records albums
Atlantic Records albums
Warner Records albums